{{Taxobox
| name = Thermicanus
| domain = Bacteria
| phylum = Bacillota
| classis = Bacilli
| ordo = Bacillales
| familia = 
| genus = Thermicanus
| genus_authority = Gößner et al. 2000
| type_species = Thermicanus aegyptius
| type_species_authority =
| subdivision_ranks = Species
| subdivision = Thermicanus aegyptius| range_map =
| range_map_caption =
}}Thermicanus is a genus of bacteria from the order Bacillales.uniProt Up to now, only one species of this genus is known (Thermicanus aegyptius'').

References

Further reading 
 
 
 
 

Paenibacillaceae
Monotypic bacteria genera
Bacteria genera